Hamilton is the fifth-largest city in Ontario, Canada. In Hamilton, there are 21 buildings that stand taller than 75 metres (230 ft). The tallest building in the city is the 43-storey,  Landmark Place.

Tallest buildings
This list ranks buildings in Hamilton that stand at least 75 m (246 ft) tall, based on CTBUH height measurement standards. This includes spires and architectural details but does not include antenna masts.

Other notable buildings and structures

Hamilton City Hall
Hamilton City Hall is an 8-storey, International-style government building located in downtown Hamilton. In 2005, Hamilton City Council designated the building as a heritage structure. Among the listed heritage elements on the exterior are the Italian glass tile mosaics.

Royal Connaught Hotel
The Royal Connaught Hotel is a historic 13-storey building located in downtown Hamilton. The hotel served as the Governors meeting hall of the NHL, the site of female athlete accommodations for the 1930 British Empire Games, and a wide variety of hotels. From 2014 to 2018, it was converted to a condominium.

CHCH Television Tower
CHCH Television Tower is a  guyed TV mast in Hamilton, which is the primary transmitter for television station CHCH-TV.

When it was built in 1960, the CHCH Television Tower became the tallest structure in Canada. Only two structures built since then are taller within Canada: the CN Tower in Toronto and the Inco Superstack in Sudbury, Ontario. The CHCH tower ranks eighth in height among the tallest structures in the British-based Commonwealth.

Current developments

See also

List of tallest buildings in Canada
List of tallest buildings in Ontario
List of tallest buildings in Toronto
List of tallest buildings in Mississauga
List of tallest buildings in Niagara Falls, Ontario
List of tallest buildings in the Waterloo Regional Municipality
List of tallest buildings in London, Ontario
Canadian architecture
Chateau Royale (Hamilton, Ontario)

References

External links
Hamilton diagrams
Skyscraperpage Hamilton
CHCH Television Tower diagram

Hamilton, Ontario
 
Tallest buildings in Hamilton